Involuntary is a 2008 Swedish film directed by Ruben Östlund described as "a tragic comedy or comic tragedy." It features five parallel stories with human group behaviour as the common theme. The film is notable for its long takes with no cuts within the scenes. This is related to Östlund's background as a skiing film director, where a cut would only indicate failure. The longest scene lasts for seven minutes.

The film received mainly positive reviews. It has won several awards at international film festivals and was nominated for five Swedish Guldbagge Awards including Best Film, but didn't win in any category. It was also selected as Sweden's submission for Best Foreign Language Film at the 82nd Academy Awards.

Production
The work with the script started already in autumn 2004, when Östlund and Hemmendorff started to write down vignettes on the theme, inspired by or taken directly from their own experiences.

Filming started in the summer 2006. One scene per day was shot during the production, with around 20 takes for each scene, although some scenes demanded far more. The independent stories were shot one at a time, meaning that many of the actors never met before the premiere.

Release
The film premiered on 19 May 2008 at the Cannes Film Festival in the section Un certain regard.

Critical reception
The general reception in Swedish press was positive. As of 14 July 2009 it had an average rating of 4.3 out of 5 based on 24 reviews at the Swedish-language review site Kritiker.se, making it the highest rated Swedish film from 2008. An exception was Jan-Olov Andersson at Aftonbladet, who rated the film 2 out of 5 and dismissed it as "Roy Andersson light."

Awards and honours

References

External links 
 
 
 
 Trailer with English subtitles (from Cinema.nl)
 English language video interview (from Cinema.nl)

2008 films
Swedish comedy-drama films
2000s Swedish-language films
Films directed by Ruben Östlund
2000s Swedish films
2008 comedy-drama films